The Boeing L-15 Scout or YL-15 was a small, piston engine liaison aircraft built by Boeing in very small numbers after World War II. It was a short take-off and landing (STOL) aircraft powered by a 125 hp Lycoming engine. The L-15 was an attempt by Boeing to expand its product line as World War II drew to a close, and Boeing's production of combat aircraft declined. Boeing decided against marketing the L-15 as a general aviation aircraft, and the twelve that were produced went to the United States Army for testing, then were transferred to the United States Fish and Wildlife Service in Alaska for various duties.

Design
The scout was a conventional geared aircraft that was also tested on ski and float gear. The unique fuselage tapered sharply behind the pilot similar to a helicopter fuselage, with a high-mounted boom supporting the tail surfaces. The original design included a single vertical stabilizer, but two small downward-mounted stabilizers were used on production models. Spoiler-ailerons were used for roll control, and full length flaps were mounted on the trailing edge of the wings. The rear fuselage was all-window, and the tandem co-pilot could swivel the chair rearward.

Although its cruise speed was only 101 mph, the aircraft was rated to be towed by another aircraft at speeds up to 160 mph.

Surviving aircraft
 47-432 – YL-15 airworthy with Keith N. Brunquist of Wasilla, Alaska.

Gallery

Operators

United States Army
United States Fish and Wildlife Service

Specifications (XL-15)

See also

References

Notes

Bibliography

Bowers, Peter M. Boeing Aircraft since 1916. London: Putnam, Third edition 1989. .

External links

  "Grasshopper's Eyes Widen" , March 1947, Popular Science article with explanation of unique features of L-15A
  "Eye For Ground Forces Fly As Low As 50 mph" , March 1947, Popular Mechanics good photo of rear observer's unique position
  "XL-15 Folds Up For A Tow" , February 1948, Popular Science middle of page
 Flight, November 20th 1947, page 573 bottom of page shows XL-15A on floats, with specification when operated as float plane
  "New Eyes For The Army Ground Forces" , October 1947, Popular Science US Army recruiting ad featuring L-15A
  "EAA video: Boeing YL-15 – Defying Physics" , EAA YouTube Published Oct 20, 2017

L-15 Scout
1940s United States military reconnaissance aircraft
Single-engined tractor aircraft
High-wing aircraft
Aircraft first flown in 1947
Twin-tail aircraft